Harold J. Vinegar is a researcher and Professor of Petroleum Geoscience at Ben-Gurion University. He is also President of Vinegar Technologies, LLC. Vinegar is one of the top highly-cited researchers (h>100) according to webometrics.

Vinegar started his career at Royal Dutch-Shell's Houston research facility in 1976 and previously served as chief scientist in physics for the company. He was also the chief scientist of Genie Energy.

Vinegar received his B.A. from Columbia University and Ph.D. from Harvard University. He was elected a member of the American Physical Society in 1999 and the National Academy of Engineering in 2003.

References 

Living people
Year of birth missing (living people)
Academic staff of Ben-Gurion University of the Negev

Columbia College (New York) alumni
Harvard University alumni
Shell plc people
Fellows of the American Physical Society